Barksdale is an unincorporated community in Laurens County, in the U.S. state of South Carolina.

History
A post office called Barksdale was established in 1892, and remained in operation until 1933. The community derives its name from a local family of pioneer settlers.

In 1925, Barksdale had 35 inhabitants.

References

Unincorporated communities in South Carolina
Unincorporated communities in Laurens County, South Carolina